Pasrur is a tehsil of the Sialkot District in Punjab, Pakistan. The city of Pasrur serves as its capital and namesake.

The tehsil, an administrative unit, was created during British rule in India, with its administrative centre located in the city of Pasrur. Village Maanga is also located in Tehsil Pasrur.

References

Sialkot District
Tehsils of Punjab, Pakistan